Ho Pui Ying (1935 – 21 November 2022) or Patsy Wongsanguan, known professionally as Patsy Kar, was a Chinese actress from Hong Kong with credits in over 70 films. Kar has a star at Avenue of Stars in Hong Kong.

Early life 
Kar was born in Guangdong, China.

Career 
Kar started her acting career with Lan Kwong Film Company. Kar debuted in A Broken-Hearted Nurse, a 1953 drama film directed by Chen Huan-Wen. In 1955, Kar appeared in The Strange Case of Three Wives, a crime film directed by Poon Bing-Kuen. Kar was most admired in How to Get a Wife, a 1961 comedy film about the urban middle-class with office romance that is directed by Chun Kim. Kar was in The Strange Girl, a 1967 film directed by Wong Yiu. Kar is credited with over 70 films. Kar is notable for her role as a wealthy lady and a social butterfly. In 1967, Kar retired from acting. After retirement, Kar appeared in Money and I, a 1971 comedy film directed by John Law.

Personal life and death 
In 1963, Kar married a Thai-Chinese man.

Kar died of chronic obstructive pulmonary disease at her home in Bangkok, on 21 November 2022, at the age of 87.

Filmography

Films 
This is a partial list of films.
 1955 The Strange Case of Three Wives - Tung Lai-Ying.
 1956 Dragnet
 1957 Moon Over Malaya (aka Ye lin yue, The Whispering Palm); Blood Stains the Valley of Love (血染相思谷); China Wife (唐山阿嫂). Note: Parts of the Nanyang Trilogy (南洋三部曲).
 1961 How to Get a Wife - Wai Ling.
 1964 The Beau - Nurse Chan Suk-On
 1967 The Strange Girl 
 1967 The Story of a Discharged Prisoner - Mak Siyan
 1971 Money and I

Awards 
 Star. Avenue of Stars. Tsim Sha Tsui waterfront in Hong Kong.

See also 
 Patrick Tse

References

External links 
 Patsy Ka Ling at hkcinemagic.com
 Patsy Kar Ling at asiaone.com
 Patsy Kar Ling at offscreen.com
 Patsy Kar Ling at filmcritics.org.hk
 Patsy Kar Ling at nationthailand.com
 Nanyang Trilogy RESTORED at asianfilmarchive.org

1935 births
2022 deaths
Hong Kong diaspora
Hong Kong film actresses
Deaths from chronic obstructive pulmonary disease